In gender studies, the analysis of gender differences in narcissism shows that male narcissism and female narcissism differ in a number of aspects.

Jeffrey Kluger, in his 2014 book The Narcissist Next Door  suggested that our society, still largely patriarchal, is more likely to tolerate male narcissism and aggressiveness than these of females. This assertion was voiced, although without definite proof, by a number of other researchers.

In 2015 a number of media outlets reported about a study at the University of Buffalo which analyzed 31 years of data of narcissism research and concluded that men consistently scored higher in the first two of three aspects of the Narcissistic Personality Inventory:  leadership/authority,  exploitative/entitlement, and grandiose/exhibitionism. The team leader of the research, Emily Grijalva, commented that on average this difference is slight (a one-quarter of a standard deviation) and there was almost no difference in the exhibitionism dimension (which covers such aspects as vanity, self-absorption and attention-seeking). She notices that a similar degree of difference is observed for other personality traits, e.g., slightly higher neuroticism for women or slightly higher risk-taking for men. The reasons of reported gender difference were outside the scope of the study, however the authors speculated that it is rooted in historically established social conventions about what is acceptable for a particular gender and what are the traditional social roles for genders.

A number of earlier studies (on smaller scales) reported similar bias.

References

Further reading
 William Beers, Women and Sacrifice: Male Narcissism and the Psychology of Religion,  Wayne State University Press, Ph.D., thesis, Hardcover – August 1, 1992, 216pp (a review and excerpt in Consuming Religion: Christian Faith and Practice in a Consumer Culture )
Scott W. Keiller, Kent State University,  "Male Narcissism and Attitudes Toward Heterosexual Women and Men, Lesbian Women, and Gay Men: Hostility toward Heterosexual Women Most of All", Sex Roles, 63(7-8), 530–541.  (Article review at Science Daily)

Narcissism
Narcissism